The 1971 Illinois Fighting Illini football team was an American football team that represented the University of Illinois during the 1971 Big Ten Conference football season. In their first year under head coach Bob Blackman, the Illini compiled a 5–6 record and finished in a three-way tie for third place in the Big Ten Conference.

The team's offensive leaders were quarterback Mike Wells with 1,007 passing yards, running back John Wilson with 543 rushing yards, and wide receiver Garvin Roberson with 372 receiving yards. Punter/halfback Terry Masar was selected as the team's most valuable player.

Schedule

Roster

References

Illinois
Illinois Fighting Illini football seasons
Illinois Fighting Illini football